Charles William Henry Howard (7 November 1904 – 1982) was an English cricketer.

Born in Beckenham, Kent and educated at Tonbridge School. He represented Tonbridge (1921–1923), Kent 2nd XI (1924–1925) and Middlesex in nine first-class matches as a professional right-handed batsman with modest success in 1931.

Howard disappeared from the cricket scene after 1931. Following research by ESPNcricinfo, it was revealed that Howard had died in 1982 at the age of 77.

References

External links
 

1904 births
1982 deaths
English cricketers
Middlesex cricketers
People educated at Tonbridge School